The BMW K1200R is a naked supersport motorcycle manufactured between 2005 and 2008 by BMW Motorrad, producing a claimed  @ 10,250 rpm from its transverse-mounted 1,157 cc inline-four engine with torque of  @ 8,250 rpm.

The cylinder block is canted toward the front wheel by 55 degrees to reduce the entire motorcycle's centre of gravity, allowing intake components to be placed above the engine, directly below the fuel tank. The optional electronic suspension adjustment (ESA) system allows the rider to electronically adjust for different road conditions and varying loads for an individualized riding style. A three-way catalytic converter in the exhaust is present to meet low emissions. As an option, the bike is available with ABS brakes.

In 2007, the K1200R Sport was launched, which is identical other than the addition of a small fairing.

At the time of launch, BMW Motorrad claimed that the K1200R was the world's most powerful naked bike. This was exceeded when Suzuki launched the  Suzuki B-King. British magazine RiDE tested the B-King and K1200R together and found that despite the extra power of the B-King, the K1200R was faster accelerating and had a  higher top speed.

, neither the K1200R nor the K1300R is offered for sale in the US.

References

External links
2007 BMW K1200R Sport Review

K1200R
Shaft drive motorcycles
Standard motorcycles
Motorcycles introduced in 2005